is a Japanese artistic gymnast.

References

External links
 Sanspo profile 
 
 
 

1982 births
Living people
Japanese male artistic gymnasts
Olympic gymnasts of Japan
Olympic silver medalists for Japan
Olympic medalists in gymnastics
Medalists at the 2008 Summer Olympics
Gymnasts at the 2008 Summer Olympics
Medalists at the World Artistic Gymnastics Championships
Universiade medalists in gymnastics
Asian Games medalists in gymnastics
Asian Games silver medalists for Japan
Gymnasts at the 2010 Asian Games
Medalists at the 2010 Asian Games
People from Ōtsu, Shiga
Nippon Sport Science University alumni
Universiade gold medalists for Japan
Universiade silver medalists for Japan
Medalists at the 2009 Summer Universiade
20th-century Japanese people
21st-century Japanese people